Glycine cyrtoloba is a species of flowering plant in the family Fabaceae, native to Queensland and New South Wales in Australia. It is a crop wild relative of soybean (Glycine max), and shows high resistance to salinity.

References

cyrtoloba
Endemic flora of Australia
Flora of Queensland
Flora of New South Wales
Plants described in 1984